Trunk Music is the sixth novel by American crime author Michael Connelly, and the fifth featuring the Los Angeles detective Hieronymus "Harry" Bosch.

Plot summary
A body found in the trunk of a Rolls-Royce seems to have connections with the mob and leads Bosch and his investigation to Las Vegas. It's Harry Bosch's first case after being transferred to the Homicide table. The car was found by a beat cop near the Hollywood Bowl. Harry arrives during a concert. Fireworks are scheduled after the concert. At the encouragement of Fire Chief, and the approval of the Medical Examiner, Bosch arranges for the car to be towed away on a flatbed tow truck. The examination of the car and body are completed in an LAPD building. After the name and address of the victim are discovered, Harry and one of his team goes to interview the wife. He then goes to search a small office the victim maintains at a small studio facility. He gains access to surveillance video of the entrance to the office. The video shows that the office had been broken into and phone bugs were taken out. The team later finds out that a branch of LAPD had placed bugs on the victim's phone without authorization. Bosch is sent to Las Vegas to track down what the victim was doing there and who had contact with him when he was there. Bosch sees video of the poker game the victim was in, and he recognizes one of the other players as a former FBI agent with whom he had an intimate relationship, Eleanor Wish. He tracks her down through the Las Vegas police chief. Bosch spends the night with her. Later, she is pulled into police HQ but Bosch clears her. Fingerprints from the murder victim's leather jacket match those of Luke "Lucky" Goshen, top aide to the Las Vegas mob boss Joseph "Marks" Marconi. In a search of Goshen's home, Bosch finds a hidden handgun. It is determined that the handgun was the murder weapon. Wish is kidnapped by the local syndicate. Bosch finds out where she is being held and frees her. Bosch extradites Goshen but on arrival in Los Angeles Bosch learns that Goshen was an undercover FBI agent whose real name is Roy Lindell, and that the FBI suspects Bosch of planting the gun found at the home of Goshen/ Lindell home. The story continues from there.

References

Harry Bosch series
1997 American novels
Novels about organized crime in the United States
Novels set in Los Angeles
Novels set in the Las Vegas Valley
Barry Award-winning works
Little, Brown and Company books